Carapachay is a town located in Vicente López Partido in Argentina. It forms part of the Greater Buenos Aires agglomeration.

History
In 1909 the Ferrocarril Central Córdoba, which subsequently became the Ferrocarril General Manuel Belgrano, crossed the territory that was to become Carapachay. In 1943 the first train stopped at Parada Km 18, which was renamed Estación Carapachay in 1946. In 1949 the district was officially founded, and in 1964 the name Carapachay was officially recognised.

External links

 carapa.com
 Local news website
 Carapachay Digital
 Municipalidad de Vicente Lopez - Historia

Populated places in Buenos Aires Province
Populated places established in 1949
Vicente López Partido